HMS Starfish was an  destroyer which served with the Royal Navy.  She was launched on 27 September 1916 and sold to be broken up on 21 April 1928. She was built by Hawthorn Leslie of Hebburn Tyne.

Construction
Starfish was one of ten  destroyers ordered by the British Admiralty in December 1915 as part of the Seventh War Construction Programme. The ship was laid down at Hawthorn Leslie's Hebburn shipyard on 26 January 1916, launched on 27 September 1916 and completed on 16 December 1916.

Armament consisted of three QF 4in Mk IV guns on the ship's centreline, with one on the forecastle, one aft on a raised bandstand and one between the second and third funnels. A single 2-pounder (40 mm) pom-pom anti-aircraft gun, while torpedo armament consisted of four 21 inch (533 mm) torpedoes in two twin mounts. The ship had a complement of 82 officers and men.

Service
On commissioning, Starfish joined the 10th Destroyer Flotilla of the Harwich Force. On the night of 23/24 January 1917, the Harwich Force was ordered to intercept a German destroyer flotilla that was being transferred from Germany to Zeebrugge, with Starfish part of a group of destroyers patrolling off the Schouwen Bank. The German destroyers ran into a cruiser division, with the destroyers  and  heavily damaged, but the Germans managed to escape, and passed Starfishs group of destroyers unobserved before reaching Zeebrugge. One German straggler,  encountered Starfishs group. An exchange of fire followed, in which S50 was hit several times by British shells, but G50 managed to torpedo the British destroyer , which later sank, before escaping and returning to Germany.

The Harwich Force was deployed to protect the bombarding force from interference, with Starfish  part of a group of cruisers and destroyers patrolling off the Thornton Bank. In October 1917, Starfish formed part of a large-scale operation, involving 30 cruisers and 54 destroyers deployed in eight groups across the North Sea in an attempt to stop a suspected sortie by German naval forces.

Starfish remained part of the 10th Destroyer Flotilla at the end of the war.

By February 1919, Starfish had transferred to the Gunnery School at the Nore, and in March was supporting the torpedo school at the Nore, while by November she had transferred to the Nore Local Defence Flotilla.

On 21 April 1928, Starfish was sold for scrap to Alloa of Charlestown.

Pennant numbers

References

Bibliography
 

 

1916 ships
R-class destroyers (1916)